The Apuí State Forest is a state forest in the state of Amazonas, Brazil.

Location

The Apuí State Forest is in the municipality of Apuí, Amazonas.
It is bounded by the Bararati Sustainable Development Reserve to the east, the Sucunduri State Park to the south and west, and the Juruena National Park to the north.
The forest is in the Amazon biome.
The mosaic includes flooded and terra firma forests, rocky fields, campina and campinarana.
It has great scenic beauty, with waterfalls and rapids.
There is great biodiversity, including 13 endemic species of primate.
The western part of the mosaic has 850 tree species, 46 mammals, more than 300 birds, 27 reptiles, 30 amphibians and nearly 100 species of fish.

History 

The Apuí State Forest Was created by Amazonas state decree 24.812 of 24 January 2005 with the objectives of promoting sustainable use of multiple forest resources, and scientific research with emphasis on sustainable exploitation of native forests.
The forest is an integral part of the Apuí Mosaic, which totals  in area and contains the Guariba and Sucunduri State Parks; Bararati and Aripuanã sustainable development reserves; Guariba Extractive Reserve; and Sucunduri, Aripuanã, Apuí and Manicoré state forests.
The management plan for the Apuí Mosaic was approved on 22 September 2010.
This was treated as the management plan for each of the conservation units as well as for the mosaic itself.

Notes

Sources

State forests of Brazil
Protected areas of Amazonas (Brazilian state)
2005 establishments in Brazil